Emilio Caprile (30 September 1928 – 5 March 2020) was an Italian footballer who played as a forward. A versatile player, he was capable of playing both as a striker and as a left winger.

Club career
Born in Genoa, Emilio Caprile's Serie A debut came at 17 years of age with Genoa in 1945 then Sestrese in Serie B as well as Legnano before going to Juventus. With Juventus he won the championship having only played five games and scoring 2 goals. Tired of riding the bench he went to Atalanta for two seasons and then to Lazio, Como in Serie B, returning finally to Legnano in Serie C. He retired after 13 seasons.

International career
Caprile made his senior international debut for Pozzo's Italy national team in the round of 16 of the 1948 London Olympics on 2 August 1948, also scoring a goal in a 9–0 win over the United States, in Brentford, at the age of 19 years, 10 months, and 2 days, making him one of Italy's youngest ever debutants. He also made another appearance in the tournament, playing in the quarterfinals, scoring a goal in Italy's 5–3 loss to Denmark. These were the only two appearances that Caprile made for Italy between 1948 and 1950. In total, he scored two goals for Italy. He was the youngest player on Italy's 1950 World Cup team, but one of four players who did not see any action throughout the tournament.

References

1928 births
2020 deaths
Footballers from Genoa
Italian footballers
Association football forwards
Genoa C.F.C. players
A.C. Legnano players
Juventus F.C. players
Atalanta B.C. players
S.S. Lazio players
Como 1907 players
Serie A players
Olympic footballers of Italy
Footballers at the 1948 Summer Olympics
Italy international footballers
1950 FIFA World Cup players
F.S. Sestrese Calcio 1919 players
Italy B international footballers